The Perdrix River (in French: rivière Perdrix) is a tributary of the Noire River which is a tributary of the Bécancour River. It flows in the municipalities of Laurierville, Plessisville (parish) and Notre-Dame-de-Lourdes, in the L'Érable Regional County Municipality (MRC), in the administrative region of Centre-du-Québec, in Quebec, in Canada.

Geography 

The main neighboring hydrographic slopes of the Perdrix river are:
 north side: Noire River, Bécancour River;
 east side: Bécancour River;
 south side: Laurendeau stream, McKenzie River, Bécancour River;
 west side: Noire River (Bécancour River tributary), Bourbon River, Bécancour River.

The Perdrix river has its source at the limit in the municipality of Laurierville.

From its head area, the Perdrix River flows over  divided into the following segments:
  westward, up to the limit of the municipality of Plessisville (parish);
  north-west, up to the municipal limit of Notre-Dame-de-Lourdes;
  west, up to the mouth.

Toponymy 
The partridge (in French: Perdrix) is a very common wild bird species in Canada.

The toponym "rivière Perdrix" was made official on December 5, 1968, at the Commission de toponymie du Québec.

See also 
 List of rivers of Quebec

References 

Rivers of Centre-du-Québec
L'Érable Regional County Municipality